François (Frans) Bauer (born 30 December 1973 in Roosendaal as François van Dooren) is a Dutch singer of "levenslied" (Dutch Schlager).

Biography
Frans Bauer was born as François van Dooren, after his mother Wies van Dooren who wasn't married to his father Chris Bauer (1944-2015) at the time.
From an early age, Frans Bauer was determined to become a singer. His great idols are Julio Iglesias, Elvis Presley and Koos Alberts. By the latter, he was sometimes brought on stage to sing along with Ik verscheurde je foto (I tore up your photo).

Bauer's own musical career was shaped in 1987, when he recorded his first single Ben je jong (Are you young) under the supervision of producers Riny Schreijenberg and Emile Hartkamp.

Bauer grew to be a local celebrity in the vicinity of the town where he lives, Fijnaart. He got his first national celebrity through the television programme All you need is love (1991), in which, with the permission of his girlfriend Mariska, he got to select two female fans (who both coincidentally are named Diana) to go out with for an evening.

The television show made Bauer famous, though, mostly because of the denial of national radio stations, it was only in 1994 that Bauer achieved his first hit called Als sterren aan de hemel staan (If stars are in the heavens)

With his German Schlager album, Weil Ich Dich Liebe (Because I love you), Bauer also conquered the German market.

In the same year, De Regenboog (The Rainbow), a duet with Dutch singer Marianne Weber reached number 1 in the Dutch charts. The year 1997 for Bauer however ended tragically: two members of his band, returning from a concert, died in a traffic incident.

Thanks to his fans Frans Bauer became more and more popular. In March 1998 he gave his first series of concerts in Ahoy. Record companies offered millions for a contract.

In 2003 the reality soap De Bauers, about the family life of Frans and Mariska, was a much watched television programme.

Bauer is also ambassador of Villa Pardoes, for children with life-threatening diseases.

In 2004, Bauer, because of his charity work and singing, was appointed to Knight of the Order of Orange-Nassau.
 
In the same year, he won the Gouden Televizier-ring, a Dutch television prize, awarded by the public.

In 2014 Bauer was the main character in the book 'Heb je even voor mij?' written by Wim Hendrikse.

Since 2019, Bauer has been one of the coaches in the Dutch television show The Voice Senior.

Notes

1973 births
Living people
Dutch levenslied singers
English-language singers from the Netherlands
German-language singers
Knights of the Order of Orange-Nassau
Musicians from North Brabant
People from Moerdijk
People from Roosendaal
21st-century Dutch male singers
21st-century Dutch singers